Robert Moloney is a Canadian actor, best known for playing Professor Alistair Gryffen in the TV series K-9.

Life and career 
Moloney was trained at the Langara College in Vancouver, where he took the theatre Arts program Studio 58. In 1995 he made his first TV appearance as Kevin McSwain in Highlander. In 2001 he appeared as Borren in Stargate SG-1, in 2008 as Koracen in Stargate: Atlantis. In 2007 he got Leo Award as Best Lead Performance by a Male in a Feature Length Drama for playing Lou Boyd in Christmas on Chestnut Street. In K-9 Moloney played the main character Professor Alistair Gryffen. In 2012 Moloney appeared as David in Random Acts of Romance. Next to his appearances in film and television, Robert Moloney also appears on theatre. For his role in the play Clybourne Park Robert Moloney got the Jessie Richardson Theatre Award as best supporting actor. He also appeared as Astrov in Uncle Vanya. Furthermore he played the radio host Tommy Bane in Except in the Unlikely Event of War. Known to cut his own hair with a Flowbee vacuum hair trimming device.

Filmography

Film

Television

Awards and nominations
Leo Awards
 2007: Best Lead Performance by a Male in a Feature Length Drama (Christmas on Chestnut Street)

Jessie Richardson Theatre Awards
 2012-2013: Outstanding Performance by an Actor in a Supporting Role (Clybourne Park)

External links

References 

Living people
Canadian male film actors
Canadian male television actors
Canadian male voice actors
Canadian male child actors
Place of birth missing (living people)
Year of birth missing (living people)